"Somos de Calle" is a promo single by Puerto Rican reggaeton performer Daddy Yankee, released for promotion of the 2008 film Talento de Barrio (see 2008 in film). It was released on July 29, 2008 by El Cartel Records.

Music video
The original video features Daddy Yankee and shows his life from 1990 to 2008, showing his success over time. An official music video was released for the remix which features many artists from the reggaeton genre, with Arcangel, De La Ghetto, Guelo Star, MC Ceja, Voltio, Ñejo, Chyno Nyno, Cosculluela, Baby Rasta credited on the collaboration. Both original and remix videos were a major success on YouTube in terms of views, being watched over 30 million and 96 million times each, respectively.

Charts

References

External links

2008 songs
Spanish-language songs
Daddy Yankee songs
Record Report Top Latino number-one singles
Songs written by Daddy Yankee